The Ninnescah River is a river in the central Great Plains of North America. Its entire  length lies within the U.S. state of Kansas. It is a tributary of the Arkansas River.

Geography
The Ninnescah River originates in the Wellington Lowlands of south-central Kansas. It is formed in southwestern Sedgwick County by the confluence of the North Fork Ninnescah River and the South Fork Ninnescah River. From there, it flows southeast into the Arkansas River Lowlands.

See also
 List of rivers in Kansas

References

 Kansas: a cyclopedia of state history, embracing events, institutions, industries, counties, cities, towns, prominent persons. Standard Pub. Co. Chicago : 1912. Volume II. Page 370.

External links

Continuous Real-Time Water-Quality Monitoring and Regression Analysis to Compute Constituent Concentrations and Loads in the North Fork Ninnescah River Upstream from Cheney Reservoir, South-Central Kansas, 1999-2012 United States Geological Survey

Rivers of Kansas
Rivers of Sumner County, Kansas
Rivers of Stafford County, Kansas
Rivers of Reno County, Kansas
Rivers of Pratt County, Kansas
Rivers of Kingman County, Kansas
Rivers of Sedgwick County, Kansas
Tributaries of the Arkansas River